The 2022–23 Atlantic 10 Conference men's basketball season started non-conference play on November 7, 2022, and will begin conference play on December 28, 2022. The regular season is scheduled to end on March 4, 2022, followed by the 2023 Atlantic 10 men's basketball tournament from March 7 to March 12.

Conference Schedule
Each team is scheduled to play 18 conference games. This results in each team playing 10 teams a singular time and 4 teams twice, once at home and once on the road.

Head Coaches

Coaches

Notes:

 Year at school includes 2022–23 season.
 Overall and Atlantic 10 records are from the time at current school and through the 2022–23 season.

Source: Atlantic 10

Preseason Awards

Preseason men's basketball poll
First Place Votes in Parenthesis

 Dayton (22) - 428
 Saint Louis (7) - 411
 VCU - 370
 Loyola Chicago - 315
 George Mason - 300
 Davidson - 294
 Richmond - 276
 UMass - 228
 Rhode Island - 203
 St. Bonaventure - 194
 Fordham - 119
 George Washington - 110
 Saint Joseph's - 107
 La Salle - 63
 Duquesne - 62

Source: Atlantic 10

Preseason Honors

Regular season

Rankings

Notes:

 Rankings are from the AP poll

Conference standings

Source: Atlantic 10

Postseason

2023 Atlantic 10 Tournament

The Atlantic 10 Men's Basketball tournament will be held in Brooklyn at Barclays Center from March 7 to March 12.

References